Javier Ruiz De Larrinaga Ibañez (born 2 November 1979 in ) is a Spanish racing cyclist, who last rode for the MMR–Spiuk CX team.

Major results

Cyclo-cross

2007–2008
 1st Cyclo-cross de Karrantza
 1st Elorrioko Ziklokrosa Basqueland
2008–2009
 1st  National Championships
 1st Cyclo-cross de Karrantza
 1st Ciclocross de Medina de Pomar
2009–2010
 1st  National Championships
2010–2011
 1st  National Championships
 1st Valladolid
2012–2013
 3rd National Championships
2013–2014
 1st  National Championships
 2nd Ziklokross Igorre
2014–2015
 2nd Ziklokross Igorre
2015–2016
 1st  National Championships
2016–2017
 1st Cyclo-cross de Karrantza
2017–2018
 1st Trofeo San Andrés
 3rd Ziklokross Igorre
2018–2019
 1st Ziklokross Igorre
 3rd National Championships

Road
2002
 1st Stage 4 Vuelta a Navarra
2003
 3rd Overall Vuelta a Cantabria

External links

1979 births
Living people
Spanish male cyclists
Cyclo-cross cyclists
Sportspeople from Álava
Cyclists from the Basque Country (autonomous community)